Sanitarium (formerly, Crystal Springs) is an unincorporated community in Napa County, California. It lies at an elevation of 587 feet (179 m).

The settlement was founded in 1878 by Seventh-day Adventists who opened a sanitarium that they called the Rural Health Retreat at Crystal Springs, later St. Helena Sanitarium, and now St. Helena Hospital.  The community that developed around the sanitarium was called Sanitarium.

The Sanitarium post office operated from 1901 to 1970, when it was removed and renamed Deer Park.

References

Unincorporated communities in Napa County, California
Vaca Mountains
Populated places established in 1878
1878 establishments in California
Unincorporated communities in California